StagKnight is an English black comedy-horror film directed by Simon Cathcart and written by Cathcart and Rob Mercer. It stars Martin Bayfield as a murderous knight who hunts down a paintball team during a weekend party. The title is a reference to a stag night, the party featured in the film.

Two tie-in Flash games were created to promote the film, the second of which had been played over a million times on Newgrounds.com prior to its deletion.

Plot
A paintballing team known as the "Weekend Warriors" heads to a woodland retreat just outside London to celebrate the marital engagement of one of their members. However, deep within the forest, an ancient warrior preserved from the time of King Arthur has awoken and begins to hunt them down one by one.

Cast
 Martin Bayfield as Knight / William
 Jocelyn Osorio as Blossom / Young Explorer
 Sandra Dickinson as Fay
 Simeon Willis as Brian
 Simon Cathcart as Sean
 James Hillier as Charles
 Barry McNeill as Steve the Queen
 Joe Montana as Roger
 John Campbell-Mac as Wolf
 Tony Tang as Makoto
 Santos Regules as Santos
 Jason Lee Hyde as David
 Paul Coskun as Mike / Brenda
 Danielle Mason as Ginger
 Harry Athwal as Driver
 Stephen Wisdom as Lead Explorer

References

External links 
 
 StagKnight website
 Shooting Script from Horrorlair

2007 films
2000s comedy horror films
2007 comedy films
2000s English-language films